Dorothy Guinto Jones (January 6, 1936 – November 7, 2001), popularly known by her stage name Nida Blanca, was a Filipino actress and comedian. After a successful acting career in films during the 1950s, many of which are with actor Nestor de Villa, she gained further prominence in television for her role in the sitcom John en Marsha (1973–1990). Blanca starred in over 163 movies and 14 television shows during her 50-year career and was named one of 15 Best Actresses of all Time by YES! magazine.

Biography
Born as Dorothy Guinto Jones on January 6, 1936, in then municipality of Gapan, Nueva Ecija, Philippines (then a U.S. territory) to an American soldier father of mestizo descent named John William Jones, Jr. (1916-1942) and a local Filipina mother with Tagalog roots named Inocenia Vélez Guinto (1913-2006), she appeared in her first film at age 15. Actress Delia Razon successfully urged the head of LVN Pictures, Doña Sisang de Leon to hire Blanca. She was screen tested on October 6, 1951, by LVN Pictures where she reigned as "queen" of movies for more than a decade, doing mostly comedies opposite the late Nestor de Villa. In the movies, she has played a wide range of roles from a butch lesbian to a nun. She also starred in the hit TV comedy series, John En Marsha, where she played the wife who sticks by her poor husband despite her rich mother's constant harping. In 1958, she appeared opposite her contemporary, noted singer/actress Sylvia La Torre, and Leroy Salvador, in the LVN movie Tuloy ang Ligaya.

Blanca was married twice. As divorce is not legal in the Philippines, she separated from her first husband, Victorino Torres, when their daughter Kaye was two years old. She later married her second husband Roger Lawrence Strunk (1941-2007) an American singer and actor, known by his screen name Rod Lauren in Las Vegas in 1979. The couple relocated to Manila.

Death
On November 7, 2001, Blanca was found murdered; beaten and stabbed 13 times in the back seat of her car in the parking lot of Atlanta Centre in Greenhills, San Juan, Metro Manila where she worked for the Movie and Television Review and Classification Board, attending screenings and rating movies twice a week, at the time of her death.

The prime suspect was Blanca's husband Rod Strunk whom the prosecutors said had hired a hitman to kill her because Blanca had disinherited him from her will. Investigators found that Blanca had up to P85 million in properties, including a Greenhills, San Juan condominium worth P10 million and a house in California worth $300,000. If Blanca had annulled her marriage, Strunk would get nothing. But if Blanca died before she was able to terminate her marriage, under the law, Strunk being the legal spouse would be entitled to a portion of his estranged wife's inheritance even though Blanca's will stated that all her properties would go to her daughter.

The case rested on the statements of witnesses and Philip Medel, a self-confessed killer who surrendered to PNP Task Force Marsha on November 19, 2001, and confessed that Strunk had hired him to kill Blanca. Medel recanted his testimony four days later, claiming the police had tortured him into confessing. The prosecutors said medical examinations had found no evidence to back his claim of torture.

Despite Medel's recantation, Strunk remained the prime suspect according to Philippine prosecutors, based largely on circumstantial evidence and statements of new witnesses. Strunk was in the U.S. in 2003 when he was charged with the murder of Blanca. He left the Philippines in January 2002 to visit his mother who was dying at the time and never returned. He was later arrested at his home and detained at the Sacramento County Jail after the Philippine government filed an extradition request against Strunk to stand trial in the Philippines. The U.S. court denied the extradition request and Strunk immediately was released from jail. The Philippine government had filed a second extradition case against Strunk but did not receive any official response from the United States government.

Strunk committed suicide on July 11, 2007, by jumping from a second-floor balcony of the Tracy Inn in Tracy, California where he had been staying for the previous three days.

Kaye Torres lamented in 2008 that after seven years, the criminal case is still pending trial. She stated that she is convinced Philip Medel is guilty of the crime.

Philip Medel remained the suspect and was held in jail until his death on April 7, 2010, at the age of 62. Medel died of sepsis caused by pneumonia at the Philippine General Hospital.

The pending murder case on Nida Blanca was featured in the Philippine television documentary series Case Unclosed as its sixth episode titled "Nida Blanca Murder Case."

Legacy
The MTRCB named a conference room after her during a ceremony in 2017.

Awards

Television

References

External links

 Case Unclosed: The Nida Blanca Murder - 11/07/2008

1936 births
2001 deaths
Filipino child actresses
Filipino women comedians
Filipino film actresses
Filipino television actresses
Filipino television personalities
Filipino murder victims
Filipino people of American descent
Filipino people of Spanish descent
Filipino Roman Catholics
Adamson University alumni
Actresses from Nueva Ecija
People from San Juan, Metro Manila
People murdered in the Philippines
Deaths by stabbing in the Philippines
20th-century Filipino actresses
20th-century comedians
Tagalog people
ABS-CBN personalities
GMA Network personalities